Martina Navratilova and Pam Shriver were the defending champions and won in the final 6–1, 6–2 against Kathy Jordan and Anne Smith.

Seeds
Champion seeds are indicated in bold text while text in italics indicates the round in which those seeds were eliminated.

 Martina Navratilova /  Pam Shriver (champions)
 Kathy Jordan /  Anne Smith (final)
 Barbara Potter /  Sharon Walsh (semifinals)
 Rosemary Casals /  Wendy Turnbull (quarterfinals)

Draw

External links
 1983 Virginia Slims of Chicago Doubles Draw

Ameritech Cup
1983 Virginia Slims World Championship Series